Lectionary 50, designated by siglum ℓ 50 (in the Gregory-Aland numbering), is a Greek manuscript of the New Testament, on parchment leaves. Palaeographically it has been assigned to the 11th century.

Description 

The codex contains lessons from the Gospels of John, Matthew, Luke lectionary (Evangelistarium), on 231 parchment leaves, with some lacunae at the beginning. It is written in two columns per page, in 17 and more lines per page, in Greek uncial letters. Full of itacismus, it contains musical notes. 

According to Scrivener it is a very valuable copy.

History 

The manuscript was examined by Matthaei and dated by him to the 14th century. 
Currently the codex is located in the State Historical Museum (V. 10, S. 226) in Moscow.

The manuscript is not cited in the critical editions of the Greek New Testament (UBS3).

See also 

 List of New Testament lectionaries
 Biblical manuscript
 Textual criticism

Notes and references 

Greek New Testament lectionaries
11th-century biblical manuscripts